E8 may refer to:

Mathematics 
 E8, an exceptional simple Lie group with root lattice of rank 8
 E8 lattice, special lattice in R8
 E8 manifold, mathematical object with no smooth structure or topological triangulation
 E8 polytope, alternate name for the 421 semiregular (uniform) polytope
 Elementary abelian group of order 8

Physics 
 E8 Theory, term sometimes loosely used to refer to An Exceptionally Simple Theory of Everything

Transport 
 E-8 Joint STARS, USAF command and control aircraft
 EMD E8, 1949 diesel passenger train locomotive 
 European route E8, part of the international E-road network, running between Tromsø, Norway and Turku, Finland
 European walking route E8, a walking route from Ireland to Turkey
 HMS E8, 1912 British E class submarine
 London Buses route E8, runs between Ealing Broadway station and Brentford
 Mikoyan-Gurevich Ye-8, 1962 supersonic jet fighter developed in the Soviet Union 
 E8, IATA code for the former Alpi Eagles airline
 E8, IATA code for City Airways
 Spyker E8, Spyker Cars model
 Hokuriku Expressway, route E8 in Japan
 East Coast Expressway and Kuala Lumpur–Karak Expressway, route E8 in Malaysia
 E8 Series Shinkansen, a Japanese high-speed train to be introduced in 2024

Other uses 
 Empire 8, intercollegiate athletic conference affiliated with the NCAA's Division III
 E-8 (rank), an enlisted rank in the military of the United States
 E8, baseball scorekeeping abbreviation for an error on the center fielder
 E8, postcode district in the London E postcode area

See also 
8E (disambiguation)